Antoni Rosołowicz (born 13 July 1933) is a Polish rower. He competed in the men's coxless four event at the 1960 Summer Olympics.

References

1933 births
Living people
Polish male rowers
Olympic rowers of Poland
Rowers at the 1960 Summer Olympics
Sportspeople from Vilnius
People from Wilno Voivodeship (1926–1939)